Patricia Thomson (born 26 November 1937 in Leeton, New South Wales) is an Australian former cricket player. Thomson played four tests for the Australia national women's cricket team.

References

1937 births
Living people
Australia women Test cricketers
People from the Riverina
Cricketers from New South Wales